This list tracks and ranks the population of the top 10 largest cities and other urban places in the United States by decade, as reported by each decennial United States Census, starting with the 1790 Census. For 1790 through 1990, tables are taken from the U.S Census Bureau's "Population of the 100 Largest Cities and Other Urban Places in the United States: 1790 to 1990." For year 2000 rankings, data from the Census Bureau's tally of "Cities with 100,000 or More Population Ranked by Selected Subject" is used. The 2010 rankings are based on the 2010 census results.

The Census Bureau's definition of an "urban place" has included a variety of designations, including city, town, township, village, borough, and municipality. The top 10 urban areas in 1790 consisted of various places designated as cities, towns and townships. The top 10 urban areas in 2010 are all separate incorporated places.

This list generally refers only to the population of individual urban places within their defined limits at the time of the indicated census. Some of these places have since been annexed or merged into other cities. Other places may have expanded their borders due to such annexation or consolidation. For example, after the 1898 consolidation of New York City, the Census Bureau has defined all the boroughs within its city limits as one "urban place". Similarly, Philadelphia's population has included the census counts within both the former urban areas of Northern Liberties, Pennsylvania and Southwark, Pennsylvania ever since Philadelphia's 1854 consolidation.

1790 

When the United States declared independence in 1776, Philadelphia was its most populous city. By the time the first U.S. census count was completed in 1790, New York City had already grown to be 14% more populous than Philadelphia (though Philadelphia still had the larger metropolitan population in 1790). Note that, in 1790, New York City consisted of the entire island of Manhattan and that Philadelphia only included the most central neighborhoods of the city.

The total population of these 11 cities was 152,087.

1800 

Rankings based on population data from the second United States Census.

The total population of these 10 cities was 216,346.

1810

Rankings based on population data from the third United States Census.

The total population of these 10 cities was 329,346.

1820 

Rankings based on population data drawn the fourth United States Census.

The total population of these 10 cities was 405,869. Last time Massachusetts has two cities in the top ten.

1830 

Rankings based on population data from the fifth United States Census

The total population of these 10 cities was 599,927.

1840 

Rankings based on data drawn from the sixth United States Census.

The total population of these 10 cities was 884,291.

1850

By 1850, the United States was in the midst of the First Industrial Revolution. Rankings based on population data compiled in the seventh United States Census.

The total population of these 10 cities was 1,459,023.

1860

Rankings based on data drawn from the eighth United States Census, the last national decennial census conducted before the outbreak of the American Civil War in 1861.  This is the first census where the Northeast does not hold a supermajority of the top ten largest cities.

The total population of these 10 cities was 2,719,910.

1870 

This was the ninth United States Census. This is the first census where the Northeast does not hold a simple majority of the top ten largest cities (Briefly returns to 6 in the 1910 census). This is also the first census in which every city in the top 10 has a population of over 100,000.

The total population of these 10 cities was 3,697,264.

1880

This was the tenth United States Census.

The total population of these 10 cities was 4,874,175.

1890 

The 1890 Census was the Eleventh. Four Midwest cities occupied the top ten spots, with two cities from Ohio in the top ten for the first time.

The total population of these 10 cities was 6,660,402.

1900 

The 1900 Census was the Twelfth.

The total population of these 10 cities was 9,487,400.

1910 

The 1910 Census was the Thirteenth.

The total population of these 10 cities was 12,401,322.

1920 

The 1920 Census was the Fourteenth. Only time three midwestern cities occupy the top five.

The total population of these 10 cities was 15,355,250.

1930 

The 1930 Census was the Fifteenth.

The total population of these 10 cities was 19,042,823.

1940 

Four of the ten cities here would have their first ever population drop in 1940.  Though slight, they would presage a precipitous decline that started in 1950.  The 1940 census was the sixteenth. This is also the first census in which the total population of the 10 largest cities combined increased by less than 10% from the last census, 10 years ago (<1% per year).

The total population of these 10 cities was 19,909,825.

1950 

1950 was a watershed year for many cities in the United States. Many cities in the country peaked in population, and began a slow decline caused by suburbanization associated with pollution, congestion, and increased crime rates in inner cities, while the improved infrastructure of the Eisenhower Interstate System more easily facilitated car commutes and white flight of the white middle class.  The G.I. Bill made available low interest loans for returning World War II veterans seeking more commodious housing in the suburbs. Although populations within city limits dropped in many American cities, the metropolitan populations of most cities continued to increase greatly. The 1950 census was the seventeenth.

The total population of these 10 cities was 21,809,384.

1960 

The 1960 Census was the Eighteenth.  This was the first census (see also 1980) to show a decline in the combined total population of top ten cities, with  826,495 ( 3.8%) fewer people than the 1950 Census' top ten cities.

The total population of these 10 cities was 20,982,889.

1970 

The 1970 Census was the Nineteenth.

The total population of these 10 cities was 22,028,346.

1980

By 1980, the population trends of urban decline and suburbanization that started in the 1950s were at their peak.  This was the second census (see also 1960) to show a decline in the combined total population of the top ten cities, with 1,142,003 (5.2%) fewer people than the 1970 Census' top ten cities, mostly due to the large drop in population of New York City. This is the first census in which half of the top ten cities are in the Sun Belt, specifically the West South Central and South Western area of the country. The 1980 census was the twentieth.

The total population of these 10 cities was 20,886,343.

1990

The 1990 Census was the Twenty-first.  Continued trends of western cities' growth and Northeastern cities' contraction now place a majority of the top ten cities in the western portion of the Sun Belt, a regional concentration not seen since Northeastern cities dominated the top of the first seven censuses.

The total population of these 10 cities was 21,872,554.

2000

The 2000 Census was the 22nd in U.S. history.

The total population of these 10 cities was 23,899,236.

2010 

Seven of the country's ten largest cities in 2010 were located in the Sun Belt region of the south and west, all of which have far lower population density than their earlier top-ranking counterparts. A different ranking is evident when considering U.S. metro area populations which count both city and suburban populations. The 2010 census was the twenty-third.

The total population of these 10 cities was 24,513,008.

2020 
2020 is the first census in which all ten of the largest cities have populations of over one million. It is also the first census since 1940 in which no cities entered or left the top ten, and the first census since 1950 in which all ten cities gained population. This was the twenty-fourth census.

The total population of these 10 cities was 26,105,017.

Totals

See also

United States
Outline of the United States
Index of United States-related articles

United States Census Bureau
Demographics of the United States
Urbanization in the United States
List of US states and territories by population
List of U.S. states by historical population
List of US cities by population
List of largest cities of U.S. states and territories by historical population
Lists of US cities and metropolitan areas
United States Office of Management and Budget
Statistical area (United States)
Combined statistical area (list)
Core-based statistical area (list)
Metropolitan statistical area (list)
Micropolitan statistical area (list)

References 
Notes

Sources

External links 
 United States, 1780-1789—discusses population size from 1780 to 1789
 
 

 
Demographic history of the United States
Histories of cities in the United States